Camille Little (born January 18, 1985) is a former American professional basketball player for the Women's National Basketball Association (WNBA). She began her WNBA career with the San Antonio Silver Stars in 2007. She played college basketball at North Carolina.

High school career
Born in Winston-Salem, North Carolina, Little played for Carver High School, where she was named a WBCA All-American. She participated in the 2003 WBCA High School All-America Game where she scored ten points.

College career
Known for her offensive skills and defensive game, Little and fellow All-American Ivory Latta led the North Carolina Tar Heels to two Final Four appearances in her four years at North Carolina. Little was voted the 2004 ACC Freshman of The Year and was named to the 2007 ACC All-Defensive Team. In her career at UNC, she has scored 1,773 points and averaged 12.8 points per game with 5.9 rebounds per game.  Little was a McDonald's All-American in high school (2003).

College statistics

Source

Professional career

Little was selected 17th overall by the San Antonio Silver Stars in the 2007 WNBA Draft. Dan Hughes, the Silver Stars' coach and general manager, was surprised she was still available: "No mock-draft scenario we put together had us able to get Camille in the second round." 

On April 9, 2008 Little was traded along with Chioma Nnamaka and the first round pick of the 2009 WNBA draft to the Atlanta Dream for Ann Wauters, Morenike Atunrase, and the second round pick of the 2009 WNBA draft. On June 22, 2008 Little was traded to the Seattle Storm for a second round pick of the 2009 WNBA Draft. Little helped the Seattle Storm win their second championship in 2010.

On January 28, 2015 Little was traded along with Shekinna Stricklen to the Connecticut Sun for Renee Montgomery, and the third and fifteen overall pick of the 2015 WNBA draft.

She averages 45.1% FG, 72.1% in free throws, and 9.2 points per game.

In 2017, Little was traded to the Phoenix Mercury along with teammate Jillian Alleyne in a three-team deal that sent Candice Dupree to the Indiana Fever along with the Mercury's 2017 first round pick and the Connecticut Sun receiving the 8th overall pick in the 2017 WNBA Draft along with Lynetta Kizer from the Fever.

Little retired from the WNBA after the 2019 season. She is now the Player Development Coach for the Dallas Wings.

WNBA career statistics

Regular season

|-
| align="left" | 2007
| align="left" | San Antonio
| 34 || 7 || 20.9 || .412 || .273 || .525 || 4.5 || 0.7 || 0.9 || 0.3 || 1.2 || 3.9 
|-
| align="left" | 2008
| align="left" | Atlanta
| 13 || 2 || 17.0 || .420 || .400 || .593 || 3.1 || 0.7 || 0.8 || 0.5 || 1.4 || 4.8
|-
| align="left" | 2008
| align="left" | Seattle
| 19 || 13 || 23.3 || .532 || .333 || .667 || 4.4 || 1.4 || 0.9 || 0.3 || 2.2 || 9.7
|-
| align="left" | 2009
| align="left" | Seattle
| 34 || 34 || 30.7 || .471 || .259 || .683 || 6.5 || 1.0 || 1.1 || 0.4 || 2.0 || 10.0
|-
| align="left" | 2010
| align="left" | Seattle
| 34 || 34 || 24.6 || .500 || .348 || .711 || 5.2 || 1.4 || 1.6 || 0.6 || 1.8 || 10.1
|-
| align="left" | 2011
| align="left" | Seattle
| 33 || 33 || 26.9 || .464 || .227 || .663 || 5.2 || 1.6 || 1.4 || 0.7 || 2.3 || 9.6
|-
| align="left" | 2012
| align="left" | Seattle
| 34 || 34 || 27.9 || .474 || .333 || .739 || 5.1 || 1.9 || 0.7 || 0.5 || 2.7 || 11.3
|-
| align="left" | 2013
| align="left" | Seattle
| 34 || 34 || 30.3 || .437 || .283 || .803 || 4.7 || 1.4 || 1.2 || 0.3 || 2.4 || 10.9
|-
| align="left" | 2014
| align="left" | Seattle
| 33 || 33 || 30.8 || .448 || .338 || .797 || 4.3 || 1.6 || 1.0 || 0.4 || 2.4 || 12.9
|-
| align="left" | 2015
| align="left" | Connecticut
| 34 || 34 || 27.0 || .406 || .345 || .879 || 3.6 || 1.6 || 1.2 || 0.2 || 1.7 || 8.2
|-
| align="left" | 2016
| align="left" | Connecticut
| 33 || 29 || 24.6 || .384 || .322 || .632 || 3.0 || 2.0 || 1.2 || 0.3 || 1.7 || 7.8
|-
| align="left" | 2017
| align="left" | Phoenix
| 34 || 34 || 25.4 || .419 || .224 || .607 || 3.8 || 1.4 || 0.9 || 0.4 || 1.6 || 7.1
|-
| align="left" | 2018
| align="left" | Phoenix
| 33 || 7 || 16.2 || .330 || .258 || .774 || 1.8 || 1.2 || 0.5 || 0.3 || 0.9 || 3.0
|-
| align="left" | 2019
| align="left" | Phoenix
| 29 || 0 || 14.7 || .435 || .333 || .806 || 2.4 || 0.8 || 0.4 || 0.3 || 0.9 || 3.9
|-
| align="left" | Career
| align="left" | 13 years, 5 teams
| 431 || 328 || 24.8 || .444 || .309 || .719 || 4.2 || 1.4 || 1.0 || 0.4 || 1.8 || 8.2

Postseason

|-
| align="left" | 2007
| align="left" | San Antonio
| 5 || 0 || 17.4 || .429 || .000 || .500 || 2.2 || 0.8 || 0.4 || 1.2 || 0.8 || 3.6
|-
| align="left" | 2008
| align="left" | Seattle
| 3 || 3 || 35.0 || .333 || .500 || .833 || 3.3 || 0.3 || 1.0 || 0.0 || 3.3 || 11.7
|-
| align="left" | 2009
| align="left" | Seattle
| 3 || 3 || 34.0 || .400 || .167 || 1.000 || 3.3 || 1.0 || 0.7 || 0.7 || 1.3 || 7.7
|-
| align="left" | 2010
| align="left" | Seattle
| 7 || 7 || 28.7 || .508 || .200 || .667 || 6.9 || 1.4 || 1.1 || 0.3 || 1.9 || 11.3
|-
| align="left" | 2011
| align="left" | Seattle
| 3 || 3 || 23.3 || .458 || .000 || .842 || 6.0 || 2.3 || 0.7 || 0.0 || 3.3 || 12.7
|-
| align="left" | 2012
| align="left" | Seattle
| 3 || 3 || 26.7 || .500 || .500 || .563 || 4.3 || 1.3 || 1.7 || 0.0 || 2.3 || 12.0
|-
| align="left" | 2013
| align="left" | Seattle
| 2 || 2 || 34.0 || .368 || .400 || .818 || 3.5 || 1.0 || 2.0 || 0.5 || 3.0 || 12.5
|-
| align="left" | 2017
| align="left" | Phoenix
| 5 || 5 || 31.6 || .571 || .500 || .800 || 6.8 || 1.4 || 0.6 || 0.4 || 1.8 || 6.0
|-
| align="left" | 2018
| align="left" | Phoenix
| 5 || 0 || 12.4 || .300 || .000 || .500 || 2.8 || 0.6 || 0.2 || 0.0 || 0.4 || 1.4
|-
| align="left" | 2019
| align="left" | Phoenix
| 1 || 0 || 22.0 || .400 || .000 || 1.000 || 5.0 || 3.0 || 1.0 || 0.0 || 1.0 || 10.0
|-
| align="left" | Career
| align="left" | 10 years, 3 teams
| 37 || 26 || 25.8 || .447 || .310 || .719 || 4.6 || 1.2 || 0.8 || 0.4 || 1.8 || 8.1

Personal life
Little is a Christian. Little has spoken about her faith saying, "It’s not about the talent I have but about the gifts God has given me to use for His glory. Basketball accomplishments are great, but they can’t compare to my relationship with God."

According to ESPN The Magazine, Little enjoys the television show SpongeBob SquarePants.

Notes

External links
WNBA Profile
Little traded to Atlanta
Little traded to the Storm
UNC bio

1985 births
Living people
American expatriate basketball people in China
American expatriate basketball people in Turkey
American women's basketball players
Atlanta Dream players
Basketball players from Winston-Salem, North Carolina
Connecticut Sun players
McDonald's High School All-Americans
North Carolina Tar Heels women's basketball players
Panküp TED Kayseri Koleji basketball players
Phoenix Mercury players
San Antonio Silver Stars draft picks
San Antonio Stars players
Seattle Storm players
Shanghai Swordfish players
Xinjiang Magic Deer players
Power forwards (basketball)